The Cocos barnacle blenny (Acanthemblemaria strata) is a species of chaenopsid blenny native to the Pacific Ocean waters around Cocos Island, Costa Rica.

References

atrata
Fish of Costa Rica
Cocos barnacle blenny